Bacha bāzī (lit. "boy play"; from  bacheh, "boy", and  bazi "play, game") is a slang term used in Afghanistan for a custom in Afghanistan involving child sexual abuse by older men of young adolescent males or boys, called dancing boys, often involving sexual slavery and child prostitution. Though outlawed, bacha bazi is still practiced in certain regions of Afghanistan. Force and coercion are common, and security officials of the Islamic Republic of Afghanistan stated they were unable to end such practices and that many of the men involved in bacha bazi are powerful and well-armed warlords.

During the Afghan Civil War (1996–2001), bacha bazi carried the death penalty under Taliban law. Under the post-Taliban government, the practice of dancing boys was illegal under Afghan law, but the laws were seldom enforced against powerful offenders, and police had reportedly been complicit in related crimes. Despite international concern and its illegality, the practice continued under the post-Taliban government.

A controversy arose after allegations surfaced that U.S. government forces in Afghanistan after the invasion of the country deliberately ignored bacha bazi. The U.S. military responded by claiming the abuse was largely the responsibility of the "local Afghan government".

History
Bacha bazi is a centuries-old practice. One of the original factors mobilizing the rise of the Taliban was their opposition to the practice. After the Taliban came to power in 1996, bacha bazi was banned along with homosexuality. The Taliban considered it incompatible with Sharia law. Both bacha bazi and homosexuality carried the death penalty, with the boys sometimes being charged rather than the perpetrators. Often, boys are selected because they are poor and vulnerable. Men who have been bacha boys face social stigma and struggle with the psychological effects of their abuse.

In 2011, in an agreement between the United Nations and Afghanistan, Radhika Coomaraswamy and Afghan officials signed an action plan promising to end the practice, along with enforcing other protections for children. In 2014, Suraya Subhrang, child rights commissioner at the national Afghanistan Independent Human Rights Commission, stated that the areas practicing bacha bazi had increased.

Modern examples
Clover Films and Afghan journalist Najibullah Quraishi made a documentary film titled The Dancing Boys of Afghanistan about the practice, which was shown in the UK in March 2010 and aired in the US the following month. Journalist Nicholas Graham of The Huffington Post lauded the documentary as "both fascinating and horrifying". The film won the 2011 Documentary award in the Amnesty International UK Media Awards.

The practice of bacha bazi prompted the United States Department of Defense to hire social scientist AnnaMaria Cardinalli to investigate the problem, as ISAF soldiers on patrol often passed older men walking hand-in-hand with young boys. Coalition soldiers often found that young Afghan men were trying to "touch and fondle them", which the soldiers did not understand.

In December 2010, a cable made public by WikiLeaks revealed that foreign contractors from DynCorp had spent money on bacha bazi in northern Afghanistan. Afghan Interior Minister Mohammad Hanif Atmar requested that the U.S. military assume control over DynCorp training centres in response, but the U.S. embassy claimed that this was not "legally possible under the DynCorp contract".

In 2011, an Afghan mother in the Konduz province reported that her 12-year-old son had been chained to a bed and raped for two weeks by an Afghan Local Police (ALP) commander named Abdul Rahman. When confronted, Rahman laughed and confessed. He was subsequently severely beaten by two U.S. Special Forces soldiers and thrown off the base. The soldiers were involuntarily separated from the military, but later reinstated after a lengthy legal case. As a direct result of this incident, legislation was created called the "Mandating America's Responsibility to Limit Abuse, Negligence and Depravity", or "Martland Act" named after Special Forces Sgt. 1st Class Charles Martland.

In December 2012, a teenage victim of sexual exploitation and abuse by a commander of the Afghan Border Police killed eight guards. He made a drugged meal for the guards and then, with the help of two friends, attacked them, after which they fled to neighbouring Pakistan.

In a 2013 documentary by Vice Media titled This Is What Winning Looks Like, British independent film-maker Ben Anderson describes the systematic kidnapping, sexual enslavement and murder of young men and boys by local security forces in the Afghan city of Sangin. The film depicts several scenes of Anderson along with American military personnel describing how difficult it is to work with the Afghan police considering the blatant molestation and rape of local youth. The documentary also contains footage of an American military advisor confronting the then-acting police chief on the abuse after a young boy is shot in the leg after trying to escape a police barracks. When the Marine suggests that the barracks be searched for children, and that any policeman found to be engaged in pedophilia be arrested and jailed, the high-ranking officer insists what occurs between the security forces and the boys is consensual, saying "[the boys] like being there and giving their asses at night". He went on to claim that this practice was historic and necessary, rhetorically asking: "If [my commanders] don't fuck the asses of those boys, what should they fuck? The pussies of their own grandmothers?"

In 2015, The New York Times reported that U.S. soldiers serving in Afghanistan were instructed by their commanders to ignore child sexual abuse being carried out by Afghan security forces, except "when rape is being used as a weapon of war". American soldiers have been instructed not to intervene—in some cases, not even when their Afghan allies have abused boys on military bases, according to interviews and court records. But the U.S. soldiers have been increasingly troubled that instead of weeding out pedophiles, the U.S. military was arming them against the Taliban and placing them as the police commanders of villages—and doing little when they began abusing children.

According to a report published in June 2017 by the Special Inspector General for Afghanistan Reconstruction, the DOD had received 5,753 vetting requests of Afghan security forces, some of which related to sexual abuse. The DOD was investigating 75 reports of gross human rights violations, 
including 7 involving child sexual assault. According to The New York Times, discussing that report, American law required military aid to be cut off to the offending unit, but that never happened. US Special Forces officer, Capt. Dan Quinn, was relieved of his command in Afghanistan after fighting an Afghan militia commander who had been responsible for keeping a boy as a sex slave.

In fiction
The musical The Boy Who Danced on Air by Rosser & Sohne premiered off-off-Broadway in 2017. Inspired by The Dancing Boys of Afghanistan documentary, it follows Paiman, a bacha bazi who is growing older and will be released from slavery soon. He meets Feda, a fellow bacha bazi, and the two consider running away as they fall in love. In the background, Paiman and Feda's masters, Jahander and Zemar, reckon with America's influence on Afghanistan's society. 

The production received positive to mixed reviews. Jesse Green, writing for The New York Times, said the work "[took] the challenge of difficult source material too far... The ick factor here is dangerously high, a problem that the production... labors hard to mitigate through aesthetics," and appreciated the romance but wished it had not attempted "a stab at political relevance." Jonathan Mandell, writing for New York Theater, said that the Jahander subplot was "one of the ways [Rosser and Sohne] are trying to compensate for their Western perspective and the show's focus on the fictional romance. But their efforts at filling in the background don't strike me as sufficient." TheaterMania's review called it "both emotionally and intellectually stirring. Anyone who cares about the future of the American musical should run out and see it now—as should anyone who cares about the country in which the United States is presently fighting the longest war in our history." 

After an online stream of the original production was released in July 2020, the work received significant backlash from Afghans, particularly LGBT Afghans, who perceived it as romanticizing child sexual abuse and criticized the white American writers for orientalism and misrepresenting bacha bazi as an accepted "tradition" in Afghanistan. The backlash led many to apologize for their involvement with the production and stream; the stream was removed ahead of schedule. After consulting with members of the Afghan community, creators Tim Rosser and Charlie Sohne acknowledged in a statement that "no Afghan voices were empowered in the creation of the show," and chose to end all distribution of the music and donate previous proceeds to Afghan charities.

See also

 Child sexual abuse
 Human rights in Afghanistan
 , cross-dressing a daughter as a boy for increased social freedom in Afghanistan
 The Dancing Boys of Afghanistan (2010 documentary)
 , cross-dressed male dancers in pre-20th century Egypt
 , cross-dressed male dancers in Ottoman Turkey
 Ubayd Zakani, a 14th-century Persian poet

References

Further reading

External links

 Joseph Goldstein, U.S. Soldiers Told to Ignore Afghan Allies' Abuse of Boys, The New York Times (September 2015)
 Confessions of an Afghan Boy Sex Slave, Newsweek (May 2015)
 Forgotten No More: Male Child Trafficking in Afghanistan, Hagar International (April 2014)
 Kandahar Journal; Shh, It's an Open Secret: Warlords and Pedophilia, The New York Times (February 2002)
This is What Winning Looks Like
PBS Frontline: The Dancing Boys of Afghanistan

Child prostitution
Child sexual abuse in Afghanistan
Dance in Afghanistan
Forced prostitution
Human rights abuses in Afghanistan
Human trafficking in Afghanistan
Male erotic dancers
Male prostitution
Prostitution in Asia
Sex trafficking
Sex workers
Sexual slavery
Sexuality in Afghanistan
Violence against men in Asia
Cross-dressing
Slavery in Afghanistan